Miguel Brugueras del Valle (1939–2006) was a Cuban politician and diplomat, and a "devout fidelista". 

During the dictatorship of Batista he was an activist. In 1959, he became a diplomat.

Brugueras was a diplomat in Paris (1973–1974), then Ambassador to Lebanon (1974–1977), Panama (1977–1979) and Argentina, and later Deputy Minister of Foreign Affairs and Tourism. He directed the Cuban news agency Prensa Latina.

In 1979, Brugueras and his wife divorced due to political differences, and she and their two daughters returned to Cuba.

His daughter Tania Bruguera is an artist.

References

1939 births
2006 deaths
Cuban politicians
Cuban diplomats